Gideon's Promise, formerly the Southern Public Defender Training Center, is a non-profit organization founded in 2007 with a fellowship from George Soros’ Open Society Foundation. The organization is based in Atlanta, Georgia, and provides ongoing continuing education programs for law school students, new public defenders, senior public defenders, law school clinicians and chief public defenders. The organization partners with public defender offices around the country to implement best practices in public defense. In the fall of 2014, president and founder Jonathan Rapping partnered with the state of Maryland in an attempt to improve statewide public defense. Rapping was honored in 2014 as a MacArthur Fellow for his work with Gideon's Promise.

References

 Martin, Michel. "Does Equal Justice For All Include The Poor?", NPR, D.C., 5 November 2013. 
 McCormack, Simon. "One Man's Fight To Change The Justice System", Huffington Post, D.C.,15 April 2014.
 Camilerri, Ricky. "Fighting The Deep South Criminal Justice System", Huffington Post, D.C., 24 June 2013.
 MacArthur Foundation. "Meet the Class of 2014", "MacArthur Foundation", Chicago, 17 September 2014.

External links 

 

Non-profit organizations based in Georgia (U.S. state)
Prison reform
Civil rights organizations in the United States
Criminal justice reform
Criminal defense organizations